Hollybrook Cemetery is a cemetery in Bassett, Southampton, England, containing around 53,000 graves as of August 2012 and still open to new burials as of March 2016. It is one of the main cemeteries in Southampton.

History 
The first burial in the cemetery took place on 5 March 1913. During the First World War, Southampton was designated "No 1 Port" – the primary point of departure for soldiers heading to the front, and for wounded servicemen arriving back in the United Kingdom. Along with other locations in the city, the Shirley Warren Infirmary (now Southampton General Hospital) was used as a military hospital during the conflict. Hollybrook Cemetery contains 113 Commonwealth war graves from the First World War, most of them located in a distinct plot close to the cemetery's main entrance.

The Hollybrook Memorial, located close to this plot, was erected to commemorate 1897 personnel from the Commonwealth land and air forces whose graves are unknown. These are all individually named on the monument itself, and include those lost or buried at sea and those who died at home but whose bodies could not be retrieved. Built to a T. Newman design, the memorial was officially unveiled on 10 December 1930 by Sir William Robertson.

Southampton also played a major part as a port in the Second World War, with 4.5 tons of military equipment passing through the port, parts of the prefabricated harbours for the Normandy invasions being constructed in the city, acting as a base for the 14th Major Port Transportation Corps of the United States Army, and the origin of the Spitfire aircraft. The city was heavily damaged in the Southampton Blitz with significant loss of life. The cemetery contains 186 Commonwealth military graves from the Second World War, three of which are the graves of unidentified Merchant Navy seamen.

The cemetery is home to a further 67 war graves of non-Commonwealth personnel, many of which were German. Two of the 67 non-Commonwealth military graves are unidentified.

Among the buildings destroyed in the Southampton Blitz was All Saints' Church in the city centre. The remains of 403 people were transferred from the catacombs of that church to a communal grave in Hollybrook Cemetery in August 1944, prior to the demolition of the ruins of the church building. Stones gathered from bomb-damaged buildings in the city were used to construct a bench, located close to the chapel, to commemorate the civilian dead of the war; the bench was constructed by David Banks of Lymington.

In the 1950s, an etched glass reredos screen was installed in the chapel by a local glass merchant, E R Wright & Son.

Comedian Benny Hill was buried in Hollybrook Cemetery. His grave was subsequently broken into as a result of rumours that his collection of gold jewellery had been buried with him.

In 2012, the city council took the decision to make the post of cemetery superintendent redundant; the role had included use of the Hollybrook Cemetery lodge as a place of residence for a nominal rent. The final postholder, Jim Emery, had been in the role for 26 years.

Buildings and structures

Cemetery gates and perimeter wall 
The primary entrance gateway to the cemetery dates from around 1910. The gateway was constructed from coursed rubble and has ashlar dressings. The central archway, the vehicle entrance, is topped with a stepped parapet incorporating the Southampton Civic Shield and flanked by piers on either side. The bases of the piers are square, with two octagonal stages above, and statues of angels on top. Pedestrian entrances are located on both sides of the gateway; each of these entrances has square piers with gabled caps on either side. A low wall of similar construction, around 2 feet high, runs from the gates around the outside of the cemetery. The gates, piers and walls were first listed for their special architectural or historic interest on 8 October 1981 and have grade II status.

Chapel 

The chapel was built around the same time as the gateway and walls and was at that time known as the "new" Chapel. However, the chapel is not included in the description of the listing of the cemetery gates and perimeter wall, and neither is it a listed building in its own right.

List of notable burials

See also 

 Southampton (old) Cemetery
 South Stoneham Cemetery

References

External links 
 

Cemeteries in Hampshire
Buildings and structures in Southampton
1913 establishments in the United Kingdom
Grade II listed buildings in Hampshire
Commonwealth War Graves Commission cemeteries in England
Commonwealth War Graves Commission memorials